The Superleague Formula round China is a round of the Superleague Formula. In 2010 China became the first country outside Europe to host a Superleague Formula event, holding two events, one at the newly built Ordos International Circuit and the other around the streets of the Shunyi Olympic Rowing-Canoeing Park.

Winners

References

External links
 Superleague Formula Official Website
 V12 Racing: Independent Superleague Formula Fansite Magazine

China